The Cessna 190 and 195 Businessliner are a family of light single radial engine powered, conventional landing gear equipped, general aviation aircraft which were manufactured by Cessna between 1947 and 1954.

The 195 model was also used by the United States Air Force, United States Army, and Army National Guard as a light transport and utility aircraft under the designations LC-126/U-20.

Development
The Cessna 190 and 195 were Cessna's only postwar radial-engined aircraft. The first prototype flew in 1945, after the end of World War II and both the 190 and 195 entered production in 1947.

The 195 was the first Cessna airplane to be completely constructed of aluminum and features a cantilever wing, similar to the pre-war Cessna 165 from which it is derived. The wing differs from later Cessna light aircraft in that it has a straight taper from root chord to tip chord and no dihedral. The airfoil employed is a NACA 2412, the same as used on the later Cessna 150, 172 and 182.

The 190/195 fuselage is large in comparison to other Cessna models because the 42" diameter radial engine had to be accommodated in the nose. There are two rows of seats: two individual seats in the first row, with a comfortable space between them and up to three passengers can be accommodated on a bench seat in the second row.

The 190/195 has flat sprung-steel landing gear legs derived from Cessna's purchase of the rights to Steve Wittman's Big X. Many have been equipped with swiveling crosswind landing gear which allows landing with up to 15 degrees of crab. While the crosswind gear simplifies the actual landing, it makes the aircraft difficult to handle on the ground. The 195 is equipped with a retractable step that extends when the cabin door is opened, although some have been modified to make the step a fixed unit.

The aircraft was expensive to purchase and operate for private use and Cessna therefore marketed them mainly as a business aircraft under the name "Businessliner".

The engines fitted to the 190 and 195 became well known for their oil consumption. The aircraft has a  oil tank, with  the minimum for flight.

A factory-produced floatplane version was equipped with a triple tail for improved yaw stability. The tail resembles that of the Lockheed Constellation.

It can accommodate five people.

Including the LC-126s, a total of 1180 190s and 195s were built.

The 190 was originally introduced at a price of USD$12,750 in 1947. When production ended in 1954 the price had risen to USD$24,700 for the 195B. This compared to USD$3,495 for the Cessna 140 two seater of the same period.

LC-126/U-20
The LC-126 was the military version of the  Cessna 195 and could be fitted with skis or floats. 83 LC-126s were delivered, including:

USAF - Cessna LC-126 - 15
Army National Guard - Cessna LC-126B - 5
US Army - Cessna LC-126C - 63

Once made surplus the majority of LC-126s were sold as civil aircraft, once modified by a Cessna civil kit.

Operational history

The Cessna 190 and 195 are considered "one of the finest classics ever built" by pilots and collectors and are much sought after on the used aircraft market.

On July 24, 2017 the number of 190s and 195s still registered in the USA were:

86 Cessna 190
225 Cessna 195
125 Cessna 195A
126 Cessna 195B

In February 2014 there were three Cessna 190s, eleven Cessna 195s, two Cessna 195As and two Cessna 195Bs registered in Canada. Other Cessna 190 and 195 aircraft have been purchased by private pilot owners resident in Brazil and the United Kingdom.

Variants

The main difference between the 190 and the 195 models was the engine installed.
190
Powered by a Continental W670-23 engine of 240 hp (180 kW) and first certified on 1 July 1947.
195
Powered by a Jacobs R-755A2 engine of 300 hp (225 kW) and first certified on 12 June 1947.
195A
Powered by a Jacobs L-4MB (R-755-9) engine of 245 hp (184 kW) and first certified on 6 January 1950.
195B
Powered by a Jacobs R-755B2 engine of 275 hp (206 kW) and first certified on 31 March 1952. It featured flaps increased in area by 50% over earlier models.
LC-126A Military designation for the Cessna 195, five-seat communication aircraft for the US Army, it could be fitted with skis or floats, 15 built.
LC-126B Similar aircraft to the LC-126 for Air National Guard use, five built.
LC-126C Variant of the LC-126A for instrument training/liaison, 63 built.
U-20B LC-126B redesignated by the USAF after 1962.
U-20C LC-126C redesignated by the USAF after 1962.

Operators

Civil
The Cessna 190 and 195 have been popular with private individuals and companies, and have also been operated by some air charter companies and small feeder airlines.

Military

Fuezas Aéreas Ejército de Cuba operated a single Cessna 190 in the early 1950s.

Army National Guard
United States Army
United States Air Force

Specifications (Cessna 195)

See also

References

 
 
 

195
High-wing aircraft
Single-engined tractor aircraft
1940s United States civil utility aircraft
United States business aircraft
Aircraft first flown in 1945